Mattias Livf, born February 24, 1974, is a Norwegian ice hockey player who plays for the Storhamar Dragons and was their current captain. Livf was born in Sweden but was granted a Norwegian citizenship in 2007 which also made him eligible for Norway's national team. He made his international debut at the IIHF World Championship in Moscow, Russia in 2007.

Playing career
Livf signed with his current team prior to the 2001/02 season after he had spent one season with the Trondheim Black Panthers. He has now played eight seasons in Norway, the last seven with Storhamar. In March 2008 he signed a two-year contract extension with the Dragons. He has been the captain of the Dragons since 2006.

References

External links
European Hockey.Net

1974 births
Living people
Norwegian ice hockey defencemen
Storhamar Dragons players
Swedish emigrants to Norway
Trondheim Black Panthers players